The Academy of Ikalto was an ecclesiastical academy established between the 11th-13th centuries in Kingdom of Georgia. Ikalto was known as one of the most significant cultural-scholastic centers of medieval Georgia, which is confirmed by the ruins of some civil building preserved at the site of the Ikalto monastery.

History
According to sources, the first academy in this area was founded in the 9th century, but during the Arab invasions it was entirely devastated. During the Georgian Renaissance, the tutor of David IV of Georgia, scholar and philosopher Arsen of Ikalto initiated the idea of refounding academy at Ikalto. The first rector of the academy was Arsen who seems to moved here from the Gelati Academy. Most of Arsen's work consists of translations of major doctrinal and polemical work, which he compiled as his massive Dogmatikon, "a book of teachings", influenced by Aristotelianism. The most complete surviving manuscript of this work (S-1463) dates to the 12th-13th century and includes sixteen key authors, such as Anastasius Sinaita, John of Damascus, Theodore Abucara, Michael Psellos, Cyril of Alexandria, Nikitas Stithatos, Pope Leo the Great and others. The academy of Ikalto had functioned for a long time, playing an important role in the history of Georgian enlightenment. Teaching basically followed the Trivium-Quadrivium method.

Architecture
The Ikalto Academy is much like the Gelati Academy except it has two floors.

References

Sources
Georgian Soviet Encyclopedia, V, p. 287, Tbilisi, 1980

Education in the Kingdom of Georgia